Joshua William Lueke (born December 5, 1984) is an American former professional baseball relief pitcher. He has played in Major League Baseball (MLB) for the Seattle Mariners and Tampa Bay Rays, and in Nippon Professional Baseball (NPB) for the Tokyo Yakult Swallows.  His impending retirement from professional baseball was announced prior to the upcoming 2022-2023 winter season of the Mexican Pacific League.

Professional career

Texas Rangers
Lueke was drafted by the Texas Rangers in the 16th round of the 2007 Major League Baseball Draft. He played for the Spokane Indians, Clinton LumberKings, and Bakersfield Blaze.

Seattle Mariners
On July 9, 2010, Lueke was traded to the Seattle Mariners along with Justin Smoak and fellow prospects Matt Lawson and Blake Beavan for Cliff Lee and Mark Lowe.

On April 3, 2011, he made his Major League debut for the Mariners against the Oakland Athletics.  He threw two-thirds of an inning giving up four runs on two hits.  He also had two walks and two strikeouts.

Tampa Bay Rays
On November 27, 2011, Lueke and a player to be named later were traded to the Tampa Bay Rays in exchange for John Jaso.

On March 16, 2013, the Rays optioned Lueke to their Triple-A team, the Durham Bulls.

On May 10, 2013, Lueke was recalled to join the Rays major league club. He pitched 1 innings in his season debut against the San Diego Padres, striking out two. Lueke was recalled by the Rays on September 1, 2013.

Lueke was designated for assignment on June 7, 2014. He cleared waivers and was outrighted to Triple-A on June 9.

Foreign & Independent Leagues
On February 4, 2015, Lueke signed with the Delfines del Carmen of the Mexican League.

Lueke played with the Tokyo Yakult Swallows of Nippon Professional Baseball for the 2016 and 2017 seasons. 

On March 22, 2018, Lueke signed with the Generales de Durango of the Mexican Baseball League. On April 21, Lueke was traded to the Acereros de Monclova of the Mexican Baseball League. 

On February 26, 2019, Lueke was traded to the Pericos de Puebla. He was released on May 22, 2019. On May 27, 2019, Lueke signed with the Long Island Ducks of the Atlantic League of Professional Baseball. On June 27, 2019, his contract was purchased by the Leones de Yucatán of the Mexican League. 

Lueke did not play in a game in 2020 due to the cancellation of the Mexican League season because of the COVID-19 pandemic. 

In 2021, Lueke posted a 2.17 ERA and earned 12 saves for Yucatán, operating as the team's closer. He became a free agent following the season. 

On January 13, 2022, Lueke signed with the Algodoneros de Unión Laguna of the Mexican League for the 2022 season.  The Algodoneros released Lueke on September 23, 2022. He finished with the second-most saves in the league for the season, with 22.

Retirement
Lueke informed Algodoneros general manager Francisco "Chipper" Méndez that he was to retire following the winter season of the Mexican Pacific League.  Lueke signed with the Charros de Jalisco on August 2, 2022 for his final season.

Legal history
While in the Rangers organization Lueke was arrested following a May 2008 incident and charged with having committed rape and non-consensual sodomy. During the investigation Lueke lied to the police by denying he had sexual contact with the victim (an assertion proven false by DNA testing), and he pleaded no contest to lesser charges of false imprisonment with violence and was sentenced to 42 days in jail, time served prior to making bail. An additional 20 days were discounted due to good behavior and Lueke received three years of felony probation.

After the July 9, 2010 trade that sent Lueke to the Seattle Mariners, team president Chuck Armstrong denied having any knowledge of Lueke's criminal past, and stated if he had known, he would have stopped the deal with Texas. Up to that point, the Mariners organization had a long history of supporting groups who oppose violence against women, running a campaign called "Refuse to Abuse" and had previously suspended and traded reliever Julio Mateo, who was accused of beating his wife. After an interview with Lueke, Mariners GM Jack Zduriencik reported that he was "satisfied with the interview and it's an issue that's behind us." Former Mariners pitching coach Rick Adair later told reporters that he had informed Zduriencik of Lueke's legal troubles, and that Rangers GM Jon Daniels had made a standing offer to take Lueke back on the night of the trade. Adair had been the Rangers minor league pitching coordinator in 2008, when Lueke was charged.

References

External links

1984 births
Living people
Acereros de Monclova players
American expatriate baseball players in Japan
American expatriate baseball players in Mexico
American sportspeople convicted of crimes
Bakersfield Blaze players
Baseball players from Kentucky
Clinton LumberKings players
Delfines de Ciudad del Carmen players
Durham Bulls players
Frisco RoughRiders players
Generales de Durango players
Hickory Crawdads players
Leones de Yucatán players
Leones del Escogido players
American expatriate baseball players in the Dominican Republic
Long Island Ducks players
Major League Baseball pitchers
Mexican League baseball pitchers
Nippon Professional Baseball pitchers
Northern Kentucky Norse baseball players
Peoria Javelinas players
Pericos de Puebla players
Seattle Mariners players
Spokane Indians players
Sportspeople from Covington, Kentucky
Tacoma Rainiers players
Tampa Bay Rays players
Tokyo Yakult Swallows players
Toros del Este players
West Tennessee Diamond Jaxx players